Jeff Badet (born August 2, 1994) is an American football wide receiver for the Vegas Vipers of the XFL. He played college football at Kentucky before transferring to Oklahoma to finish his collegiate career, and signed with the Minnesota Vikings as an undrafted free agent in 2018. He also played for the Washington Football Team, and Michigan Panthers. In the 2020 XFL Draft, he was selected fourth overall by the Dallas Renegades.

High school career 
Badet attended Freedom High School in Orlando, Florida, playing for the school's football team as a wide receiver. He was ranked as a three-star recruit and as the nation's 127th receiver prospect by 247sports, committing to the University of Kentucky, rejecting other offers from colleges closer to his home, such as South Florida and FIU.

College career 
In 2013, his freshman year, he saw limited action, appearing in eight games, totalling 22 receptions for 285 yards and one touchdown. Following a serious injury, Badet was medically redshirted for his second year, the 2014 collegiate season. In his sophomore season the year after, Badet played in eleven of the team's twelve games and compiled 29 receptions for 430 yards and two touchdowns, as the team's third leading receiver. His junior season was his most productive of his college career, appearing in all 13 games, with 31 catches for 670 yards and 4 touchdowns, leading the team in receiving yards. In the seventh game of the season, Badet had best statistical game of his career, with 7 receptions for 139 yards and 2 touchdowns in a 40-38 victory over Mississippi State, his sole multi-touchdown collegiate game. In the offseason, Badet declined to declare for the NFL Draft and instead transferred to Oklahoma, crossing conferences into the Big 12. Badet was less statistically productive, totalling 26 receptions for 400 yards and three touchdowns, but the Sooners enjoyed team success, finishing with a 12-2 record behind Heisman Trophy-winning and eventual first overall pick Baker Mayfield, culminating with a 54-48 defeat in the Rose Bowl against Georgia. He served as a influencing presence on the field and locker room, and ran a 4.27 40-yard dash at Oklahoma's Pro Day.

Statistics

Professional career

Minnesota Vikings
Badet declared for the 2018 NFL Draft but went undrafted and later signed as an undrafted free agent for the Minnesota Vikings. He was placed in the team's concussion protocol after the first preseason game against the Jacksonville Jaguars, but returned for the team's next three preseason games. He appeared in all four of the team's preseason games, totalling 5 receptions for 34 yards. He was placed on the team's practice squad before the start of the season. In June of 2019 he participated in the 40 Yards of Gold contest to determine the fastest player in the NFL and he was supposed to earn $25,000, but only received a check for his participation and performance.

Badet re-signed with the Vikings and was given a $75,000 bonus to keep him away from the New York Jets, who were also pursuing him. He appeared in the team's four 2019 preseason games, seeing limited snaps, touching the ball just twice for 17 yards. Badet was hampered by a groin injury that forced him to miss several practices. He was cut by the Vikings before the start of the 2019 NFL season.

Dallas Renegades
Badet declared for the 2020 XFL Draft, impressing team scouts at the various combines and was selected as the fourth pick of the skills position phase by the Dallas Renegades. Renegades general manager and head coach Bob Stoops, who coached at Oklahoma before Badet's arrival in 2017, drafted him. Badet had a unique helmet that featured Allen Iverson, Michael Jackson, and SpongeBob SquarePants. In his second game against the Los Angeles Wildcats, Badet caught six passes for 53 yards. Badet finished the season with 16 receptions for 108 yards. He had his contract terminated when the league suspended operations on April 10, 2020.

Washington Football Team
On September 17, 2020, Badet signed with the Washington Football Team's practice squad. He was elevated to the active roster on October 24 and November 7 for the team's weeks 7 and 9 games against the Dallas Cowboys and New York Giants, and reverted to the practice squad after each game. Badet was promoted to the active roster on November 9, 2020. He was waived on December 19, 2020, and re-signed to the practice squad three days later. He signed a reserve/futures contract with the team on January 11, 2021, but was waived on May 3, 2021.

Atlanta Falcons
On June 17, 2021, Badet signed with the Atlanta Falcons. He was waived/injured on August 6, 2021 and placed on injured reserve. He was released on August 17 with an injury settlement.

Las Vegas Raiders
On November 10, 2021, Badet was signed to the Las Vegas Raiders practice squad. He was released on December 4.

Michigan Panthers
On February 23, 2022, Badet was selected with the sixth pick of the 15th round of the 2022 USFL Draft by the Michigan Panthers. He was transferred to the team's inactive roster on April 22, 2022, due to a hamstring injury. He was released on May 10.

Vegas Vipers
Badet was drafted by the Vegas Vipers of the XFL in the 2023 XFL Draft. 

In his debut with the team he caught six passes for 81 yards and two touchdowns, including the first touchdown of the season from Luis Perez in the team's 20–22 loss.

Career statistics

Regular season

References 

1994 births
Living people
American football wide receivers
Players of American football from Orlando, Florida
Kentucky Wildcats football players
Oklahoma Sooners football players
Atlanta Falcons players
Minnesota Vikings players
Dallas Renegades players
Washington Football Team players
Las Vegas Raiders players
Michigan Panthers (2022) players
Vegas Vipers players